Statistics of Primera Fuerza in season 1927-28.

Overview
It was contested by 8 teams, and América won the championship.

League standings

Club España left the league and lost their last 4 matches by default vs. América, México FC, Atlante and Necaxa (0-1 each game)

Top goalscorers
Players sorted first by goals scored, then by last name.

References
Mexico - List of final tables (RSSSF)

1927-28
Mex
1927–28 in Mexican football